The Embassy of Kosovo in Washington, D.C. is the main diplomatic mission of Kosovo to the United States.

The embassy is currently located at 2175 K Street, NW Suite 300, Washington, D.C. The embassy was established in October 2008 and the first chancery was in Georgetown.

The current ambassador is Ilir Dugolli, who is the highest-ranking representative of Kosovo to the U.S. government. He succeeded Vlora Çitaku, who served in that position in the period between September 17, 2015 to March 3, 2021. The first Ambassador of Kosovo in Washington, DC was Avni Spahiu.

The Embassy represents the Republic of Kosovo in the United States of America. The mission is to promote political, economic and cultural relations with the United States, as well as to contribute to further strengthening of the U.S. and Kosovo relations.

The embassy is supported by a consulate general in New York located at 801 Second Avenue, Suite 405 New York.

List of representatives

See also

 List of diplomatic missions of Kosovo
 Foreign relations of Kosovo
 Kosovo–United States relations
 List of diplomatic missions in the United States
 List of diplomatic missions in Washington, D.C.

External links 
 Official website of the Embassy

Government of Kosovo
Kosovo–United States relations
Kosovo
Washington, D.C.